Wang Lina (born 30 March 1997) is a Chinese boxer.

She won a medal at the 2019 AIBA Women's World Boxing Championships.

References

1997 births
Living people
AIBA Women's World Boxing Championships medalists
Chinese women boxers
Light-heavyweight boxers